This page lists the albums that reached number-one on the Top R&B/Hip-Hop Albums and Top Rap Albums charts in 2004, which had been recently created in 2004. The Rap Albums chart, first published by Billboard in November 2004, partially serves as a distillation of rap-specific titles from the overall R&B/Hip-Hop Albums chart.

Chart history

See also
2004 in music
2004 in hip hop music
List of Hot R&B/Hip-Hop Singles & Tracks number ones of 2004
List of Billboard 200 number-one albums of 2004

References 

2004
2004
United States RandB Hip Hop Albums